This is a list of the main career statistics of Japanese tennis player Kimiko Date.

Performance timelines

Only main-draw results in WTA Tour, Grand Slam tournaments, Fed Cup and Olympic Games are included in win–loss records.

Singles

Doubles

WTA career finals

Singles: 15 (8 titles, 7 runner-ups)

Doubles: 10 (6 titles, 4 runner-ups)

WTA 125 tournament finals

Singles: 1 (runner-up)

ITF Circuit finals

Singles: 19 (14 titles, 5 runner-ups)

Doubles: 14 (7 titles, 7 runner-ups)

Top 10 wins

Notes

References

Date, Kimiko